Billiards and snooker were held at the 2009 Southeast Asian Games at Convention Hall, Don Chan Palace, Vientiane, Laos.

Medal tally

Medalists

Men

Women

Men's events

Singles snooker

Doubles snooker

Single English billiards

Doubles English billiards

Singles cushion caroms

Singles 8-ball

Singles 9-ball

Doubles 9-ball

Women's events

Singles 8-ball

Singles 9-ball

References
Results list

2009 Southeast Asian Games events
Southeast Asian Games
Cue sports at the Southeast Asian Games
Cue sports in Laos